Epilobium palustre is a species of willowherb known by the common name marsh willowherb. This plant has a circumboreal distribution, and can be found farther south in mountainous areas.

Description
This is a hairy perennial growing spindly stems sometimes exceeding half a meter in height. Its stems have widely spaced oval to linear leaves two to seven centimeters long. The stems are tipped with hairy inflorescences of small white or pink flowers. The stigma is club-shaped rather than 4-lobed. Each flower has four petals which may be quite minute to almost a centimeter long and notched to form two lobes. The fruit is a hairy capsule 3 to 9 centimeters long.

Distribution
Locally common in the British Isles.

References

External links
 Jepson Manual Treatment
 Photo gallery

palustre
Plants described in 1753
Taxa named by Carl Linnaeus